The San Diego Jewish Journal, headquartered in Sorrento Valley, San Diego, California, is a Jewish magazine founded in October 2001 by Dr. Mark Moss and Mark Edelstein, and first published in December 2001. Their intent was to create a magazine that spoke to all Jewish movements and traditions. In 2007, the magazine served 19,000 subscribers in San Diego, Palm Springs, and Temecula Valley.  Mark Moss and Mark Edelstein are the publishers.

In 2007, the San Diego Jewish Times, a biweekly newspaper with which it had competed, with about 16,000 subscribers, ceased publication after 27 years.

In 2015, the American Jewish Press Association awarded the Journal 2nd place in its annual Simon Rockower Awards competition.

References

External links
San Diego Jewish Journal website
American Jewish Press Association Member Profile
American Jewish Press Association Rockower Award Winners, 2015
"About Us". San Diego Jewish Journal

Jewish magazines published in the United States
Jews and Judaism in San Diego
Mass media in San Diego
Magazines published in California
Magazines established in 2001